Ana Ivanovic won the title, defeating Martina Hingis in the final, 6–2, 6–3. At 18 years and 41 weeks of age, Ivanovic became the youngest female player to win the tournament, only to be surpassed by Belinda Bencic who won the title in 2015 aged 18 years and 23 weeks. Kim Clijsters was the defending champion, but retired due to a left wrist sprain in the second round against Stéphanie Dubois.

Finals
The finals match for the Rogers Cup was fought between Ana Ivanovic of Serbia and Martina Hingis of Switzerland. The match was originally scheduled on the 20th of August but was moved to the next day due to rainfall. This match was their first career encounter with Ivanovic winning. Ivanovic dominated on her serve and just lost 12 points in her eight service games as she broke Hingis' serve four times to win the match 6–2, 6–3 in just 58 minutes.

Seeds
The top eight seeds received a bye into the second round.

  Kim Clijsters (second round, retired due to a left wrist sprain)
  Maria Sharapova (withdrew)
  Nadia Petrova (second round)
  Svetlana Kuznetsova (quarterfinals)
  Nicole Vaidišová (third round, withdrew due to a right should tendinitis)
  Anastasia Myskina (second round)
  Martina Hingis (final)
  Francesca Schiavone (second round)
  Dinara Safina (semifinals)
  Anna-Lena Grönefeld (second round)
  Daniela Hantuchová (third round)
  Flavia Pennetta (second round)
  Ana Ivanovic (champion)
  Katarina Srebotnik (quarterfinals)
  Maria Kirilenko (second round)
  Li Na (first round)
  Anabel Medina Garrigues (second round)

Draw

Finals

Top half

Section 1

Section 2

Bottom half

Section 3

Section 4

External links 
 Draw and Qualifying Draw

Singles